This is a round-up of the 1996 Sligo Senior Football Championship. St. Mary's made a triumphant return after a nine-year gap, with a late surge to deny Eastern Harps back-to-back titles. John Kent won his ninth Senior Championship in the process, a record unequalled, having played with all of the town side's title-winning teams prior to this win.

First round

Quarter finals

Semi-finals

Sligo Senior Football Championship Final

References

 Sligo Champion (July–September 1996)

Sligo Senior Football Championship
Sligo Senior Football Championship